The Scout Association of Belize, a national Scouting organization in Belize was formed in 1987 as a successor to The Scout Association of the United Kingdom's Belize branch. The association became a member of the World Organization of the Scout Movement in 1987. The coeducational Scout Association of Belize claimed (an unaudited) 3,041 members as of 2011, with some 27 Scout groups located in six districts.

History
For the history of the Scout Movement in Belize, generally and as distinct from The Scout Association of Belize, see Scouting in Belize. There is record of scouts in Belize as early as 1910.

The Boy Scouts Association of the United Kingdom formed a branch in British Honduras in 1917 with a census of eight Scouters, 113 Scouts and 59 Cubs, a total membership of 180. The branch flourished for about three to four years, then became defunct.
 

Scouting was revived again in 1931 in the Belize City area, by Brother John Mark Jacoby, SJ, MBE, Professor of Mathematics at St. John's College. Hundreds of boys, including many leading citizens, passed through the hands of 'Bra Jake', as he was affectionately known (pictured at left). For many years, Scouting revolved around activities held at the Holy Redeemer Scout room (the home of troops 1, 2 and 3) and at an annual summer camp at San Pedro, Ambergris Caye. In 1936 Scouting was introduced to the districts beginning with the Stann Creek District and eventually spreading to all the others. Since that time there has always been Scout activity in the country. The level of this activity has varied considerably over the years, depending largely on the extent of the Association's ability to attract and maintain committed voluntary leadership.

In the late 1950s the Association acquired from the government  of land in the Burrell Boom area. Later named Camp Oakley, this site has been the venue for many national camps, training seminars and other Scout programs. In 1971, with the help of a grant from the Baron Bliss Trust, a concrete building was erected at the camp.

Scouts from Belize have taken part in many international camps in the Caribbean, Mexico, Central America and the United States. In 1979, the Association embarked on a revitalization program which continues today.

The Scout Association of Belize was constituted as an autonomous association in 1987 and succeeded The Scout Association Belize Branch. The association exists by virtue of the Scout Association of Belize Act, 1987 (assented to on January 25, 1988). On 15 December 1987, The Scout Association of Belize became a member organization of the World Organization of the Scout Movement (WOSM) and joined its InterAmerican Conference on 18 September 1988.

Hilberto B. Riverol has been National Executive for the Scout Association of Belize for many years and is by all means one of the greatest pillars of the association in Belize. As National Executive he has been the lead active force in the growth of the association and been at the head of dramatic changes in the association, brought about by programs which have generated and unprecedented growth in membership, an example being the Scouting in Schools which garnered the support of the Ministry of Education in Belize.

Awards and recognitions
The Highest Rank or Medal for a Belize Scout to achieve is the Queen's Scout Award. This achievement recognizes the hard work, dedication, sacrifice, knowledge and understanding of the Scouting ideals and principles. The award has had few recipients over the years making the circle of awardees only seven so far in its 99-year history: Marlon McNab (1st Holy Redeemer Scout Unit), Khendis Ellis (1st. Orange Walk Scout Group), Edguin Castellanos, (1st Orange Walk Scout Group) Victoria Burgos, Nicholas Ruiz, Sean Usey, Lisette Ordonez (9th Belize St. Ignatius Scout Group). Victoria Burgos was the first female Scout in Belize to receive this highest award. In 2011 Fernando Oliva from the (9th Belize St. Ignatius Scout Group) is recorded as the last recipient of the Queen's Scout Award.

The highest rank or medal for a Belize Scout Leader is the Silver Wolf.  Those that have received the award include, Sir Colville Young GCMG, Governor General of Belize - Patron of Belize Scouts, Hilberto B. Riverol - National Scout Executive, Martha Sosa - Executive Secretary for The Scout Association, Dr. Erasmo Franklin - Past Chief Scout.

The membership badge of The Scout Association of Belize incorporates the coat of arms of Belize and the color scheme of the flag of Belize.

See also
 The Girl Guides Association of Belize

References

External links
Official homepage

World Organization of the Scout Movement member organizations
Scouting and Guiding in Belize

Youth organizations established in 1911